Jack Leo Van Impe (February 9, 1931 – January 18, 2020) was an American televangelist known for his half-hour weekly television series Jack Van Impe Presents, an eschatological commentary on the news of the week through an interpretation of the Bible. The program airs around the world through both religious broadcasters and the purchase of paid programming time on commercial television stations. He was known as the "Walking Bible", having memorized most of the 
King James Version of the Bible. His wife, Rexella, shared his television ministry as co-host.

Early life and marriage 
Van Impe's parents, Oscar Alphonse Van Impe and Marie Louise, née Piot, immigrated from Belgium to the city of Troy, Michigan, a suburb of Detroit, in the United States in 1929. Jack Leo Van Impe was born on February 9, 1931, in Freeport, Michigan.<ref>Religious Leaders of America, 2nd ed., Gale Group, 1999</ref> He was the couple's only child. Van Impe decided to become an evangelist after he saw his father become a missionary with very strong faith.

According to Van Impe, he and his father Oscar played the accordion at night clubs, and Oscar regularly swore and drank alcohol, and believed that religion was hogwash. At meals, Van Impe would drink alcoholic beverages along with his father, which is a European tradition. Then when Van Impe was twelve years old, Oscar converted to evangelical Christianity, and Oscar and Jack together smashed all of their bottles of alcoholic beverages. Since that event, Van Impe did not consume any alcohol.

Jack Van Impe played accordion duets with his missionary father across Michigan and other states. In 1948, Van Impe graduated from high school and entered Detroit Bible Institute, where he earned his diploma in 1952. It was then that he began his career as a preacher and evangelist and extensive recording career.

While working with the Billy Graham crusades, he was at a Youth For Christ rally with Chuck Ohman (a friend of Jack's who was a trumpeter for Percy Crawford's "Youth on the March" television broadcasts). Here, Jack Van Impe met his future wife, Rexella Mae Shelton, who was an organist with the crusades. Rexella was born in Missouri on November 29, 1932, and was named after her father, Rex Shelton. The couple were married on August 21, 1954, and together started Jack Van Impe Ministries.

 Recordings 
Beginning in the 1950s, Van Impe released dozens of Gospel and spoken word recordings. His first album Presenting the Van Impes features Jack on the accordion and Rexella on organ. Subsequent musical recordings featured the accorgan, a type of electronic accordion. Parts of an unknown sermon were used in the 1995 house song "Sex on the Streets" by Pizzaman, although Van Impe talked about the same events in his 1970 album Marked for Death.

 Biblical prophecy beliefs 
Jack Van Impe believed in one particular interpretation of the literal meaning of the Bible (King James version) that states, according to Revelation 13, that a single world political leader (the Beast) and a single world religious leader (the False Prophet) will emerge, but the Rapture will happen before either leader comes to power. He believed that the Bible teaches that the world will be organized into ten political subdivisions, based on the ten-district plan set up by the Club of Rome, and that this ten-division world empire will be jointly ruled by the European Union and the Islamic world, which he believed are represented by the two iron legs of the prophetic dream statue in the Book of Daniel. Van Impe believed in the Prophecy of the Popes, and that according to said prophecy, Pope Francis is Peter the Roman, the predicted pope who will preside during Armageddon.

Van Impe preached a Pre-Tribulation Rapture of "The Body of Christ" and also said a one-world religion will form, named "Chrislam"; the joining of the world's two largest religions (Christianity and Islam). He believed that the Bible states that the world political leader will "come in peaceably" (per Daniel 11:21) and create a seven-year peace deal involving Israel (per Daniel 9:27). Then, three and a half years into the peace, Russia (the interpreted meaning of "Rosh" from Ezekiel 38:2 and 39:1; Van Impe also identified Meshech and Tubal from the same passages as Moscow and Tobolsk respectively), along with its Middle Eastern allies ("Persia, Cush, and Put", from Ezekiel 38:5), will break the peace by invading Israel, according to Ezekiel 38, and the military of Russia and its allies will be decimated by nuclear warfare and pushed back to Siberia. Then China (the interpreted meaning of "kings from the east" from Revelation 16:12) will invade, and the military of China will likewise be decimated when Jesus returns.

Mark 13:9 “You must be on your guard. You will be handed over to the local councils and flogged in the synagogues."  Van Impe at various times in his last decades seemed very urgent that all signs had been fulfilled, but never mentions that Christians were being flogged in synagogues.  In the September 3, 2016, episode of Jack Van Impe Presents, a news headline is interpreted as fulfilling the prophecy in Isaiah that the city of Damascus would be completely destroyed, increasing Van Impe's insistence that the end of time would happen "very, very soon."

Strangely, Jack believed that at any one moment, the 24 time zones on earth would be labeled by three different days.  His confusion about this was stated more than once because he felt it fulfilled the prophecy that no man would know the day of Jesus' return.

 Jack Van Impe Presents Jack Van Impe Presents is a weekly telecast produced by Van Impe's non-profit organization at the Jack Van Impe Ministries World Outreach Center, in Rochester Hills, Michigan. Van Impe's wife, Rexella, co-hosts.

In June 2011, Trinity Broadcasting Network refused to air an episode of Jack Van Impe Presents that criticized Robert Schuller and Rick Warren for promoting "Chrislam". In response, Van Impe ceased airing his show on TBN.

 Health and death 
In one episode of Jack Van Impe Presents'', which aired during the week of June 19, 2006, Van Impe informed his audience that he had undergone two total knee replacements in early 2006. He gave thanks to God for his recovery and for leading him to the "wonderful surgeon" who performed the operation. Subsequent to the problems with his knees, Van Impe suffered from cancer, a severe sepsis attack, and blood loss resulting from stomach ulcers which he attributed to his NSAID arthritis medication. On the episode which aired during the week of May 31, 2015, Jack Van Impe was absent from the program, and Rexella Van Impe explained that he had been hospitalized for triple by-pass heart surgery. Carl Baugh co-hosted the program until Van Impe's return to his weekly show on October 3, 2015.

On January 7, 2017, Rexella Van Impe announced that Jack Van Impe had broken his hip, but was recovering. Carl Baugh co-hosted that program as well. In Jack's absence, Rexella Van Impe co-hosted the program with various guests: Carl Baugh for six episodes, Dave Williams for six episodes, Dr. Robert Jeffress for two episodes, and Walt Sheppard for three episodes. From April to May, 2017, re-runs were aired until the May 27, 2017, broadcast when Jack Van Impe reappeared beside Rexella, and the couple announced that, under doctor's advice, they were ending the TV broadcast. Thereafter, weekly videos were posted on the organization's Web site. In 2018, radio and television broadcasts resumed, with Chuck Ohman serving as their announcer.

Jack Van Impe died on January 18, 2020, at a hospital in Royal Oak, Michigan at the age of 88, three weeks before his 89th birthday.

References

External links 
 Jack Van Impe Ministries World Outreach Ministries website
 Jack Van Impe at Rapture Ready
 Jack Van Impe (And Rexella) : Premillennial Dispenationalist Preterist Study Archive, preteristarchive.com
 Heart Disease in Christ's Body Book review from Middle Town Bible Church

1931 births
2020 deaths
20th-century accordionists
20th-century American male musicians
20th-century American male writers
20th-century apocalypticists
20th-century evangelicals
21st-century American male writers
21st-century apocalypticists
21st-century evangelicals
American accordionists
American critics of Islam
American evangelicals
American people of Belgian descent
American television evangelists
Christian critics of Islam
Christian media
Evangelical writers
Michigan Democrats
People from Barry County, Michigan
Place of death missing
Television personalities from Detroit
William Tyndale College alumni